A Millennium Library may be:

Millennium Library (Winnipeg)
A library designation given by the White House Millennium Council